This is a list of international co-produced Philippine films and television series .

The first film co-produced by a Philippine film studio with a studio based outside the Philippines is Rodrigo de Villa. The film was produced with Indonesian film outfit Persari.

Excluded in this list are works with a foreign cast (such as Ignacio de Loyola) which had primarily Spanish actors but was produced only by a Philippine-based studio, works which were adaptations of foreign media, and media produced solely by foreign production companies that are set in the Philippines and despite including Filipinos in its cast (such as Metro Manila).

Films

Television series

Notes

References

 
Philippines
 
Lists of films and television series
Co-produced
Co-produced